Eva Llamas Hernández (born 29 May 1992) is a Spanish footballer who plays as a defender for Primera División club Real Betis.

References

External links

1992 births
Living people
Spanish women's footballers
UD Granadilla Tenerife players
Real Betis Féminas players
Primera División (women) players
Women's association football defenders
CE Sant Gabriel players
Sportswomen from Catalonia
People from Badalona
Sportspeople from the Province of Barcelona
Footballers from Catalonia